That Beautiful Somewhere is a Canadian feature film written, directed and produced by Robert Budreau, produced by Ian Murray and executive produced by Bill Plumstead and Matthew Stone for Loon Film Inc. and Lumanity Productions. The film stars Roy Dupuis and Jane McGregor. The screenplay was based on the novel Loon, by William (Bill) Plumstead, who was also its executive producer. It was filmed on location in Temagami, Bonfield and North Bay, Ontario in 2005 and completed in 2006. Its world première, attended by Budreau, Dupuis, and Murray, occurred on August 26, 2006, during the Montreal World Film Festival. It was also shown at the Atlantic Film Festival, the Cinéfest Sudbury International Film Festival, the Calgary International Film Festival.

The film was theatrically released across Canada in late April 2007.

Premise
A detective teams up with a young female archaeologist to unravel the mysterious death of a 'bog body' found in a native swamp rumoured to have curative powers. It is the story of two wounded souls searching for healing and redemption.

Cast
 Roy Dupuis as Detective Conk Adams
 Jane McGregor as Catherine Nyland
 Gordon Tootoosis as Harold
 Marc Veilleux as Jake Steed
 Jeremy Ellies as Dr. Kelevra

Production
Part of the film was shot in the École secondaire catholique Algonquin auditorium.

Notes

External links
 That Beautiful Somewhere Official website (includes preview video)
 
 Review at canoe.ca

2006 films
English-language Canadian films
Canadian drama films
Films based on Canadian novels
Films set in Northern Ontario
2006 drama films
Films directed by Robert Budreau
2000s English-language films
2000s Canadian films